was a Japanese daimyō of the early Edo period. Iemasa, the son of Hachisuka Masakatsu or Koroku, was the founder of the Tokushima Domain. He was one of some daimyo who have bad terms with Ishida Mitsunari.

His father was a retainer of Hideyoshi. But later 
Iemasa served both Oda Nobunaga and Toyotomi Hideyoshi, taking part in the Battle of Yamazaki 1582, Invasion of Shikoku 1585 and Hideyoshi's Korean campaign 1592-1598. 

In 1600, Iemasa fought on the side of Tokugawa Ieyasu at the Battle of Sekigahara, and was allowed to retain his fief for his service there.

Family
 Father: Hachisuka Masakatsu
 Mother: Daishō-in (d. 1611)
 Wife: Jiko-in (1563–1606), daughter of Ikoma Ienaga, lord of Koori castle, and descendant of Fujiwara no Yoshifusa
 Concubine: commoner
 Children:
 Hachisuka Yoshishige by Jiko-in
 Manhime (1593–1612) married Ikeda Yoshiyuki by commoner
 Akihime married Ii Naotaka by commoner
 Tatsuhime (d. 1629) married Matsudaira Tadamitsu by commoner

References
This article was created from corresponding content on the Japanese Wikipedia

1558 births
1639 deaths
16th-century Japanese people
17th-century Japanese people
Daimyo
Samurai
Hachisuka clan
People from Aichi Prefecture